Whim is a historic sugar plantation located in Southwest subdistrict about  southeast of Frederiksted on Centerline Road on Saint Croix, U.S. Virgin Islands. It was listed on the National Register of Historic Places in 1976.

The estate's Great House was built in about 1794 by Christopher Mac Evoy, Jr., is about " in plan, and is unusual for its "curved ends and complex exterior articulation".  The site has steam engines and other features besides original buildings.

It includes Danish neo-classicism architecture.

References

External links
Historic American Engineering Record documentation, filed under Frederiksted, St. Croix, VI:

Sugar plantations in Saint Croix, U.S. Virgin Islands
Plantations in the Danish West Indies
Saint Croix, U.S. Virgin Islands
Commercial buildings completed in 1794
Historic American Engineering Record in the United States Virgin Islands
National Register of Historic Places in the United States Virgin Islands
Buildings and structures completed in 1810
1794 establishments in North America
1790s establishments in the Caribbean
1790s establishments in Denmark
18th century in the Danish West Indies